The Astana Cup was a tennis tournament held in Astana, Kazakhstan held in 2010 and 2011.

Past finals

Singles

Doubles

References

External links

 
ATP Challenger Tour
Tennis tournaments in Kazakhstan
Hard court tennis tournaments
Sport in Astana